Geranium ibericum, commonly called Caucasian crane's-bill or (in North America) Iberian geranium or Caucasus geranium, is a herbaceous plant species in the family Geraniaceae. It is native to Western Asia, including Turkey and the Caucasus, and is cultivated as a garden subject. It has a dense mounding habit, and violet colored flowers.

References

ibericum
Plants described in 1787
Taxa named by Antonio José Cavanilles